Wardy Hill is a hamlet in Coveney  civil parish, part of East Cambridgeshire, England. It is also the site of a former Iron Age Hill fort

References

Hamlets in Cambridgeshire
East Cambridgeshire District